The 2016/17 FIS Race (ski jumping) was the 18th FIS Race regular season as the fourth level of ski jumping competition since 1999/00. Although even before the world cup and in the old days FIS Race events were all top level organized competitions.

Other competitive circuits this season included the World Cup, Grand Prix, Continental Cup, FIS Cup and Alpen Cup.

Calendar

Men

Ladies

Men's team

References

2016 in ski jumping
2017 in ski jumping
FIS Race (ski jumping)